"Sanguibacteroides" is a genus from the family of Porphyromonadaceae with one known species ("Sanguibacteroides justesenii").

References

Bacteroidia
Bacteria genera